Donald McLeary (born  27 November 1967)  is a Scottish actor, author and writer. He is best known for writing popular podcast Fags, Mags and Bags and starring as school teacher Mickey John in CBeebies show Me Too!.

Career 
Donald grew up in Rutherglen, Scotland, and currently works and lives in the city of Glasgow. 

From 2006 to 2007, Donald played school teacher Mickey John in popular children's television programme Me Too!, which aired on CBeebies. He is titled as Donald Cameron in the cast list.

Donald has starred and co-written Scottish comedy podcast Fags, Mags and Bags since 2007, airing on BBC Radio 4 and BBC Sounds.  He plays the part of Dave Legg. 

Donald has also provided material for Scottish comedy Chewin' the Fat.

In 2018, he wrote an audiobook for Doctor Who, titled "Donald's River Song audio, Kings of Infinite Space".

In 2018, Donald received a Writers Guild Award in November 2008 for Radio Comedy of the Year.

References

External links 

Scottish television personalities
Scottish television presenters
Scottish actors
Living people
1967 births